Chionodes apolectella is a moth of the family Gelechiidae. It is found on Corsica and Sardinia.

The wingspan is about 18 mm. The forewings are whitish, with a slight ochreous tinge, shaded with pale brownish along the dorsum. The hindwings are shining bluish grey.

References

Moths described in 1900
Chionodes
Moths of Europe